"Rolling Stone" is Suzi Quatro's debut solo single released in 1972. Quatro's name was misspelled Susie Quatro on the initial packaging. The single was not successful, except in Portugal, where it went to number one.

Background
It was Quatro's first solo single and was released after she moved from the United States to Britain. In the United States, she had already released two singles with the all-female band The Pleasure Seekers.

The B-side, "Brain Confusion (For All the Lonely People)", was written by Quatro and initially recorded while she was part of the Pleasure Seekers. The Pleasure Seekers became Cradle. When Mickie Most saw Quatro perform the song with Cradle he decided to sign her as a solo act. The version of the song on this single is a re-recording with Quatro and session players.

The song "Rolling Stone" was initially written by Phil Dennys, who did arrangements for the band Jade. The lyrics were rewritten by Hot Chocolate front man Errol Brown (and Quatro herself, uncredited) so they were more suitable for Quatro.

Personnel
Suzi Quatro – bass, lead vocals
Peter Frampton – guitar
Micky Waller – drums
Errol Brown – backing vocals

Notes

References

1972 debut singles
1972 songs
Songs written by Errol Brown
Song recordings produced by Mickie Most
Suzi Quatro songs
RAK Records singles